Caém is a municipality in the state of Bahia in the North-East region of Brazil.

See also
List of municipalities in Bahia

References

External links

Municipalities in Bahia